Novelty is the characteristic of being new or heretofore unseen. It may also refer to:

Science and technology
 Novelty seeking, psychological stance
 Novelty effect, tendency for human performance to briefly improve given new toys
 Novelty as described by the theory of emergence, regarding how new complexity arises from more simple interactions.
 Novelty (neurology), novelty as neurological stimulus
 Novelty (patent), part of the legal test to determine whether an invention is patentable
 Apomorphy, evolutionary novelty, a characteristic that is different from the form of an ancestor

Arts
 Novelty dance, a type of dance that is popular for being unusual or humorous
 Novelty song, a musical item that capitalizes on something new, unusual, or a current fad
 Novelty show, a competition or display in which exhibits or specimens are in way some novel

Commerce
 Novelty item, a small manufactured adornment, toy or collectable
 Promotional item, novelties used in promotional marketing

Philosophy
 Novelty theory, an eschatological theory promoted by Terence McKenna

Fashion
 Novelty architecture, a building or other structure that is interesting because it has an amusing design
 Novelty (chess), a chess term for a move in chess which has never been played before in a recorded game

Things
 Novelty (locomotive), one of the first steam locomotives which was due to compete at the Rainhill Trials of 1829
 Novelty (album) by Jawbox

Places
 Novelty, Missouri, a place in the United States
 Novelty, Ohio, an unincorporated community in the United States